Little Dixie (also Little Dixi) is an unincorporated community in Pike County, Kentucky, United States.

Notes

Unincorporated communities in Pike County, Kentucky
Unincorporated communities in Kentucky